Robert Chester Sheets (born June 7, 1937) is a meteorologist who served as the director of the National Hurricane Center from 1987 to 1995. He was born in Marion, Indiana. He is well remembered for numerous interviews given from the Hurricane Center during Hurricane Andrew in 1992.  Sheets also was a member and eventual director in Project Storm Fury, an attempt to modify hurricanes with silver iodide.  Since retiring in 1995, Sheets has continued his relationship with the media, becoming a special-situation hurricane analyst with ABC network affiliates in Florida.  He has also co-authored a book on hurricane information and stories.

References 

Books

External links 
 National Hurricane Center

American meteorologists
Living people
University of Oklahoma alumni
Ball State University alumni
1937 births
Scientists from Indiana
National Weather Service people